The Allen Institute for Cell Science is a research institute established by Paul Allen in Seattle, Washington on 8 December 2014. The institute is modelled in large part on the Allen Institute for Brain Science and received the same initial financial commitment from Allen— over five years. The two Institutes also share the same building.

The focus of the institute will be "How does information encoded in our genes become living cells, and what goes wrong when a disease affects those cells?" All data generated and research tools developed by the institute will be made publicly available online.

The inaugural executive director for the institute is Rick Horwitz, formerly of the University of Virginia.

Among those serving on the institute's science advisory board is Joan Brugge, chairwoman of the Department of Cell Biology at Harvard Medical School.

References

External links
 

Research institutes in Seattle
2014 establishments in Washington (state)
Organizations established in 2014